Lenino (Russian: Ленино(Камчатка)) is a former air base in Kamchatka Krai, Russia located 11 km west of Lenino.  It is a large abandoned military base 120 km west of Petropavlovsk, and may have been designed for Tupolev Tu-16 operations during the 1950s and 1960s.  It appears to have been abandoned in the 1970s.

References 

Defunct airports
Airports built in the Soviet Union
Airports in Kamchatka Krai

Soviet Long Range Aviation Arctic staging bases